The 2009 East–West Shrine Game was the 84th staging of the all-star college football exhibition game featuring NCAA Division I Football Bowl Subdivision players. The game featured over 100 players from the 2008 college football season, and prospects for the 2009 Draft of the professional National Football League (NFL). In the week prior to the game, scouts from all 32 NFL teams attended. The proceeds from the East–West Shrine Game benefit Shriners Hospitals for Children.

The game was played on January 17, 2009, at 3 p.m. CT at Robertson Stadium on the campus of the University of Houston, and was televised by ESPN2. The game was won by the East team, 24–19.

The offensive MVP was Marlon Lucky (RB, Nebraska), while the defensive MVP was Michael Tauiliili (LB, Duke). The Pat Tillman Award was presented to Collin Mooney (FB, Army); the award "is presented to a player who best exemplifies character, intelligence, sportsmanship and service".

Scoring summary 

Sources:

Statistics 

Source:

Coaching staff 
East head coach: Bobby Ross

West head coach: Gene Stallings

Source:

Rosters 
Source:

2009 NFL Draft

References

Further reading 
 
 
 

East-West Shrine Game
East–West Shrine Bowl
American football competitions in Houston
January 2009 sports events in the United States
East-West Shrine Game
2009 in Houston